Robbie Ivison (born 5 September 2000) is an English professional footballer who plays for Gretna 2008, as a midfielder.

Career
Ivison started his career with Carlisle United, moving onto Queen of the South in April 2017 at the age of sixteen.

Ivison signed with Gretna 2008 in July 2020 after spending a season at Tow Law Town.

References

2000 births
Living people
English footballers
Queen of the South F.C. players
Scottish Professional Football League players
Association football midfielders
Carlisle United F.C. players
Gretna F.C. 2008 players